Texter is a surname. Notable people with the surname include:

Gilda Texter (born 1946), American costume designer, wardrobe supervisor, and actress
John Texter (born 1949), American engineer

See also
Dexter (name)
Exter (surname)
Textor (surname)